Na-moo, also spelled Na-mu, is a Korean unisex given name. Unlike most Korean names, which are composed of two Sino-Korean roots each written with one hanja, "Namoo" is an indigenous Korean name: a single word meaning "tree", "wood" or "firewood". It is one of a number of such indigenous names which became more popular in South Korea in the late 20th century.

People
People with this name include:
 Choi Na-moo (born 1990), South Korean actress
 Yoon Na-moo (born 1985), South Korean actor

Fictional characters
Fictional characters with this name include:
 Na-moo, in the 2013 South Korean television series Empress Ki
 Na-moo, in the 2015 South Korean television series Shine or Go Crazy
 Yoon Na-moo, in the 2018 South Korean television series Come and Hug Me

See also
List of Korean given names

References

Given names
Korean unisex given names